Casearia williamsiana is a species of flowering plant in the family Salicaceae. It is endemic to Honduras.

References

williamsiana
Endemic flora of Honduras
Critically endangered flora of North America
Taxonomy articles created by Polbot
Plants described in 1895